Brayan Moreno Cárdenas (born 26 June 1998) is a Colombian footballer who currently plays as a forward for Boyacá Chicó on loan from Celaya.

Career statistics

Club

Notes

References

1998 births
Living people
Colombian footballers
Colombian expatriate footballers
Association football forwards
Ascenso MX players
Categoría Primera A players
Club Celaya footballers
Atlético Huila footballers
Boyacá Chicó F.C. footballers
Expatriate footballers in Mexico
Colombian expatriate sportspeople in Mexico
Sportspeople from Chocó Department